Abacetus inexpectatus is a species of ground beetle in the subfamily Pterostichinae. It was described by Kryzhanovskij and Abdurachmanov in 1983.

References

inexpectatus
Beetles described in 1983